USS B-2 (SS-11) was one of three B-class submarines built for the United States Navy in the first decade of the 20th century.

Description
The B-class submarines were enlarged versions of the preceding Plunger class. They displaced  on the surface and  submerged. The B-class boats had a crew of one officer and nine enlisted men.

For surface running, they were powered by one  gasoline engine that drove the single propeller shaft. When submerged the propeller was driven by a  electric motor. The boats could reach  on the surface and  underwater.

The B-class boats were armed with two 18 inch (450 mm)  torpedo tubes in the bow. They carried two reloads, for a total of four torpedoes.

Construction and career
B-2 was laid down by Fore River Shipbuilding Company in Quincy, Massachusetts, under subcontract from Electric Boat Company of New Suffolk, L. I., as Cuttlefish, making her the first ship of the United States Navy to be named for the cuttlefish, a 10-armed marine mollusk similar to the squid.

Cuttlefish was launched on 1 September 1906 sponsored by Ms. Eleanor Gow, daughter of Commander J. L. Gow, and commissioned on 18 October 1907. She reported to the Second Submarine Flotilla, Atlantic Fleet.

Cuttlefish operated along the Atlantic coast, running experiments, testing machinery and equipment, and conducting extensive training exercises until going into reserve at Charleston Navy Yard on 30 November 1909. Recommissioned on 15 April 1910, she served with the Atlantic Torpedo Fleet until joining the Reserve Torpedo Group at Charleston Navy Yard on 9 May 1911. The boat was renamed B-2 on 17 November. B-2 remained in reserve until placed out of commission on 4 December 1912. On 6 December, she was towed to Norfolk, Virginia, and loaded onto  for transfer to the Asiatic Station. Sailing via the Suez Canal, Ajax arrived at Cavite, Philippine Islands on 30 April 1913, and B-2 was launched on 12 May. She was recommissioned on 2 August and assigned to the Torpedo Flotilla, Asiatic Fleet. She remained on duty in the Philippines, Naval Base Manila, until decommissioned at Cavite on 12 December 1919. B-2 was subsequently used as a target.

See also
USS B-1
USS B-3

Notes

References

External links
navsource.org: USS Cuttlefish
hazegray.org: USS Cuttlefish

United States B-class submarines
World War I submarines of the United States
Ships sunk as targets
Shipwrecks in Manila Bay
Ships built in Quincy, Massachusetts
1906 ships
Maritime incidents in 1919